MT Palflot-2 was a Russian oil tanker that caught fire in the Caspian Sea in April 2016.

Description 
Its average speed was 6.7 knots and its maximum speed was 10.8 knots. It was manned by a crew of eleven.

History 
On 23 April 2016, Palflot-2 was underway from Dubandi, Azerbaijan, towards Alaja, Turkmenistan. It was not carrying any oil at the time, and its tanks were filled with seawater ballast. After entering the territorial waters of Turkmenistan, a fire started on the deck of the vessel and quickly grew. Helicopters and other vessels were deployed from Turkmenistan to fight the fire, which was extinguished after a few hours. The tanker was then towed back to Baku, and its rescued crew were taken to Astrakhan. The Russian Embassy in Turkmenistan send a letter of gratitude to its Ministry of Foreign Affairs expressing appreciation for Turkmen assistance with the maritime incident.

References 

Tankers of Russia
1981 ships
Maritime incidents in 2016